Auty may refer to:

People
 Clint Auty (born 1969), Australian cricket player
 Josh Auty (born 1990), British speedway rider
 Martyn Auty (born 1951), English film and television producer
 Peter Auty (born 1969), English operatic tenor
 Wilf Auty (1881–1951), English rugby union player

Places
 Auty, Tarn-et-Garonne, commune in the Tarn-et-Garonne department in the Occitanie region in southern France